Gregor Cvijič (born 26 March 1972) is a Slovenian handball player. He competed in the men's tournament at the 2000 Summer Olympics.

References

1972 births
Living people
Slovenian male handball players
Olympic handball players of Slovenia
Handball players at the 2000 Summer Olympics
Handball players from Ljubljana